Robert J. Peters (born April 26, 1985) is an American politician serving as a Democratic member of the Illinois Senate for the 13th district. The Chicago-based district includes all or parts of East Side, Hyde Park, Kenwood, South Chicago, South Shore, and Woodlawn. Peters took office on January 6, 2019 to succeed Kwame Raoul. He is the chair of the Illinois Senate Black Caucus.

Early life and career 
Peters was born in Chicago, Illinois on April 26, 1985. His biological mother suffered from a substance abuse disorder, and he was raised by his adopted parents who worked as a social worker and a civil rights lawyer. He was born deaf and with a speech impediment, and regained full hearing ability at age 8 and full speech capability at age 12. He attended Kansas State University from 2004 to 2009.

His initial engagement in electoral politics was during Toni Preckwinkle's successful campaign for Cook County Board President in 2010. He later worked for Groupon, before returning to politics as an organizer for the non-profit Chicago Votes.

Prior to his appointment, Peters was the political director for Reclaim Chicago and the People's Lobby. The People's Lobby endorsed and mobilized on behalf of candidates including Kim Foxx in the 2016 Cook County State's Attorney election and Bernie Sanders in the 2016 Democratic presidential primary. He also previously worked for the Illinois Coalition for Immigrant and Refugee Rights, and served as the political director for Daniel Biss' unsuccessful campaign for Governor of Illinois in 2018. He is a dues-paying member of both the People's Lobby and United Working Families.

Illinois State Senator (2019–present) 
Peters was appointed to the Illinois State to represent the 13th district in January 2019, to replace outgoing Senator Kwame Raoul upon the latter's election as Attorney General of Illinois. Under Cook County's appointment process, the Democratic Party committeepeople in the area of the district received weighted votes in choosing Raoul's replacement; in this case, the largest weighted votes were held by alderman Leslie Hairston and Cook County Board President Toni Preckwinkle. Upon his appointment, Peters signaled his commitment to continuing Raoul's emphasis on issues of bail reform and marijuana legalization.

He successfully ran for re-election in 2020, winning 52% of the vote in the March 17 Democratic primary election against Ken Thomas and winning the November 3 general election uncontested. In the primary election, both candidates agreed on most issues but Thomas charged that Peters was appointed through a "backroom deal." Peters was endorsed by a number of progressive organizations including United Working Families, Equality Illinois, and Reclaim Chicago, and most of his campaign contributions came from labor unions.

During the 2019–20 term, Peters was the chief co-sponsor of 13 bills that were signed into law, including legislation on banning private civil detention centers, ending "pay to stay" practices in correctional facilities, and expanding access to SNAP benefits, preventative HIV treatment, and apprenticeships for youth. He has cited improving the Department of Children and Family Services as a top legislative priority, and three of his co-sponsored bills focused on this agency, requiring expansion of post-adoption support services, collection of feedback from youth transitioning out of foster care, and provision of preventative care to reduce homelessness, incarceration, and unemployment. In October 2020, he introduced a bill, along with Rep. Justin Slaughter, to end the use of cash bail in Illinois. He served as the inaugural chair of the Senate's Special Committee on Public Safety.

In December 2020, Peters was elected by his colleagues as the chair of the Illinois Senate Black Caucus.

As of July 2022, Senator Peters is a member of the following Illinois Senate committees:

 Appropriations - Criminal Justice Committee (SAPP-SACJ)
 (Chairman of) Appropriations - Emergency Management Committee (SAPP-SAEM)
 Criminal Law Committee (SCCL)
 Environment and Conservation Committee (SNVR)
 Health Committee (SHEA)
 Human Rights Committee (SHUM)
 Labor Committee (SLAB)
 (Chairman of) Public Safety Committee (SPUB)
 (Chairman of) Redistricting - Chicago South Committee (SRED-SRCS)
 Revenue Committee (SREV)
 Sealing and Expungement Committee (SCCL-SCSE)
 Subcommittee on Long-Term Care & Aging (SHEAA-SHLT)
 (Chairman of) Subcommittee on Children & Family (SHEA-SHCF)

Electoral history

References

1985 births
21st-century American politicians
African-American state legislators in Illinois
Democratic Party Illinois state senators
Kansas State University alumni
Living people
Politicians from Chicago
21st-century African-American politicians
20th-century African-American people